The Poole and District Electric Tramways operated an electric tramway service in Poole between 1901 and 1905.

History

The Poole and District Electric Traction Company was a subsidiary of British Electric Traction. A single line was built from Poole railway station through Upper Parkstone to County Gates. The fare for the journey was 3d.

The company operated a fleet of 17 tramcars from a depot at Ashley Road in Upper Parkstone.

Closure

The system was bought by Poole Corporation in 1905 and leased for thirty years to Bournemouth Corporation Tramways from June 1905, and this line was subsumed into their system.

References

External links
 Poole and District Electric Tramways uniformed staff

Tram transport in England
3 ft 6 in gauge railways in England